In mathematics, the spectral gap is the difference between the moduli of the two largest eigenvalues of a matrix or operator; alternately, it is sometimes taken as the smallest non-zero eigenvalue.  Various theorems relate this difference to other properties of the system.

See also
 Cheeger constant (graph theory)
 Cheeger constant (Riemannian geometry)
 Eigengap
 Spectral gap (physics)
 Spectral radius

References

External links 
 

Spectral theory